My Little Baby, Jaya  is a 2017 South Korean drama film directed by Yoon Hak-ryul.

Plot
The story of a 45-year-old man with cerebral palsy whose life is completely shattered when his teenage daughter, a victim of escalating school bullying and sexual violence,commits suicide. Feeling helpless and further let down by society, he decides to take extreme measures to express his grievances.

In the end, he disfigures the girls that bullied his daughter by disfiguring then with acid and murders the boys that gang raped her. However, he is then committed suicide as he has nothing left to live for.

Cast

Kim Jeong-kyoon as Won-sool
Oh Ye-seol as Jaya
Hwang Do-won as Min-kyeong 
Kim Saet-byeol as Hye-seon
Lee Cheol-hee as Yoo-jeong
Park Se-ah as Bo-ra
Yoon Ra-yeong as Soon-yeong
Jung Ooi-cheol as Tae-seong
Kim Jong-won as Hwi-ram
Kim Jeong-yoon as Seung-woo
Yang Hye-kyeong as In-mi
Lee Ah-yoon as Ye-cheon
Kim Tae-rin as Yoo-jin
Kim Sam-han as Mr. Kim 
Song Yoon as Hyeong-soo
Kim Ji-hong as Convenience store boss 
Yoon Soon-hong as Principal
Lee Kye-in (special appearance)
Lee Han-wi (special appearance)
Jeong Oon-taek (special appearance)
Kwon Yeong-chan (special appearance)
Choi Cheol-ho (special appearance)
Lee Eung-kyung (special appearance)
Oh Sol-mi (special appearance)
Park No-shik (special appearance)
Kim Kwang-sik (special appearance)
Myeong Seung-kwon (special appearance)

Awards and nominations

References

External links

2017 films
2017 drama films
South Korean drama films
2010s South Korean films